Primitive socialist accumulation, sometimes referred to as the socialist accumulation, was a concept put forth in the early Soviet Union during the period of the New Economic Policy. It was developed as a counterpart to the process of the primitive accumulation of capital that took place during the early stages and development of capitalist economies. Because the Soviet economy was underdeveloped and largely agrarian in nature, the Soviet Union would have to be the agent of primitive capital accumulation to rapidly develop the economy. The concept was proposed originally as a means to industrialize the Russian economy through extracting surplus from the peasantry to finance the industrial sector.

History 
The major proponent of the concept was Yevgeni Preobrazhensky in his 1926 work The New Economics which was based on his 1924 lecture in the Communist Academy, titled The Fundamental Law of Socialist Accumulation. The concept was proposed during the period of the New Economic Policy. Its main principle is that the state sector of economy of the transitional period has to appropriate the peasant's surplus product to accumulate resources necessary for the growth of  the industry. To this end, the major mechanisms were the foreign trade monopoly held by the state and price control in favor of industry which in effect caused price scissors.

This theory was criticized politically and associated with Leon Trotsky and the Left Opposition, but it was in fact put into practice by Joseph Stalin in the 1930s as when Stalin said in his speech to The Captains of Industry that the Soviet Union had to accomplish in a decade what England had taken centuries to do in terms of economic development in order to be prepared for an invasion from the West.

Ernest Mandel, Marxist economist, challenged the view that Stalin implemented the policies of Trotsky with the same methods as he stated "Stalin is said to have put Trotsky's programme into practice, even if with a brutality Trotsky himself would not have approved". He further elaborated that the economic programme advocated by Trotsky and the Left Opposition "undoubtedly underwent many changes in the period 1923-35". Mandel also argued that the policies of the Left Opposition are distinguishable from the proposals of the United Opposition of 1926-7 and the alternative strategies developed by Trotsky in his later works such as "The Revolution Betrayed (1936) and "The Transitional Programme (1938)".

Beyond publications and policy debates, the application of this theory affected the working class as well, as more surplus was extracted from them for industrial capital investment.  Real wages for both regular workers and managers plummeted despite the growing wage differential.  Piece work production relations were introduced wholesale. Soviet penal policy also tightened, causing a significant growth of inmates in the Gulag. It was not until after Stalin's death that a minimum wage was introduced, reductions to piece work production relations were made and mass rehabilitations resulted in the dissolution of most of the Gulag.

See also 
 Capital accumulation
 Capitalism
 Economy of the Soviet Union
 Scissors Crisis

References 

Socialism
Economy of the Soviet Union